The Kadia are a Muslim community found in the states of Gujarat and Maharashtra in India. They are Muslim converts from the Hindu Kadia caste.

References

Social groups of Gujarat
Muslim communities of India
Indian castes
Muslim communities of Gujarat
Muslim communities of Maharashtra